Encyclia alata is a species of orchid.

References

alata
alata
Orchids of Belize
Orchids of Central America